Yabu Band is an Indigenous Australian rock, roots band formed in 1998 in Kalgoorlie. The word yabu is Wongutha – a western desert tribal language – for 'rock' or 'gold'. Core members are brothers Delson (vocals) and Boyd Stokes (guitar & vocals); and Jade Masters (drums) with Lionel Sarmardin (drums 2017). When performing live they are joined by Roy Martinez (bass), Elizabeth Gogos (vocals), Tony Shaw (didgeridoo) and Tim Ayre (keyboards)and other Supporting artist. They won a Deadly award in 2009 for Most Promising New Talent in Music. Delson Stokes Jr was the 1999 NAIDOC Male Youth of the Year. Boyd Stokes won Guitarist of the Year and Jade Masters won Drummer of the Year at the 2009 TOO SOLID Music Awards held in Perth. Yabu are a four time WAMi (West Australia Music Industry) award winner.

In May 2012 Yabu Band toured Australia to promote their single, "Petrol, Paint and Glue", which highlights indigenous abuse of inhalants. Tracks from their next album, My Tjila, were performed. They were supported by Kimberley musician, John Bennett. "Petrol, Paint and Glue" was nominated as Single of the Year at the 2012 Deadlys – to be held in September. Delson had written the track twelve years earlier after a family member had died from petrol sniffing.

Yabu Band released a debut EP in March 2021.

Discography

Albums

Extended plays

Singles

Awards and nominations

Deadly Awards
The Deadly Awards, was an annual celebration of Australian Aboriginal and Torres Strait Islander achievement in music, sport, entertainment and community.

 (wins only)
|-
| Deadly Awards 2009
| Yabu Band
| Most Promising New Talent
| 
|-

WAM Song of the Year
The WAM Song of the Year was formed by the  Western Australian Rock Music Industry Association Inc. (WARMIA) in 1985, with its main aim to develop and run annual awards recognising achievements within the music industry in Western Australia.

 (wins only)
|-
| 2008
| "Gundulla - We Dance"
| Indigenous Song of the Year
| 
|-
| 2012
| "Petrol Paint & Glue"
| Mentally Healthy of the Year
| 
|-

West Australian Music Industry Awards
The West Australian Music Industry Awards (WAMIs) are annual awards presented to the local contemporary music industry, put on annually by the Western Australian Music Industry Association Inc (WAM). Yabu Band won four awards.
 
 (wins only)
|-
| 2009
| Yabu Band
| Indigenous Act of the Year 
| 
|-
| 2010
| Yabu Band
| Indigenous Act of the Year 
| 
|-
| 2011
| Yabu Band
| Indigenous Act of the Year 
| 
|-
| 2012
| Yabu Band
| Indigenous Act of the Year 
| 
|-

References

Western Australian musical groups
Indigenous Australian musical groups
Musical groups established in 1998